Tearaght Island or Inishtearaght (meaning "the westerly") is an uninhabited steep rocky island west of the Dingle Peninsula.

Geography 
At longitude 10° 39.7' Tearaght is the westernmost of the Blasket Islands, and thus the westernmost island of Ireland. It is also one of the westernmost points in Europe after Iceland,  and Azores. However, there are some exposed rocks further west: Tearaght Rocks, Tearaght Rocks West (10° 41.0'), and Foze Rocks (10° 41.3').

A narrow neck of rock, with a natural tunnel through it, joins the two parts.

Demographics

Nature 
Like the other Blasket Islands, Tiaracht holds large numbers of seabirds, with internationally important populations of Manx shearwater and European storm-petrel. Leach's storm-petrels have also been found there (but not proved to be breeding) in recent years. The number of auks, especially puffins, has apparently fluctuated greatly, though early records are not always reliable.

Inishtearaght Lighthouse 
A lighthouse was established on the island in 1870, and automated in 1988. The light was served by the steepest funicular rail track in Europe from 1913 until automation.

See also 
 Lighthouses in Ireland
 Extreme points of Europe

References

External links
 Details of lighthouse

Lighthouses in the Republic of Ireland
Blasket Islands
Marilyns of Ireland
Uninhabited islands of Ireland